Adam Christian Clark is an American film director, screenwriter, and editor, who is best known for combining naturalistic techniques in performance and dialog with stylized cinematic devices in editing and camerawork.

Early life
Adam Christian Clark was raised in Seattle, Washington.

Career

Early career
Clark attended the University of Southern California School of Cinematic Arts. While still a student, he worked as a director on the CBS network television series Big Brother.  He then worked as a roster director at Quentin Tarantino's and Lawrence Bender's production company A Band Apart, where he wrote and directed television, music videos, and commercials. Clark has worked with such artists as Kanye West, Jackie Chan, Gnarls Barkley, Lupe Fiasco, and Girl Talk; and such brands as Pepsi, Lays, Motorola, MAC, and Diesel.

Clark spent 2006 in Shanghai, writing and directing Mainland China's first reality television series.

In 2008, Clark collaborated on two projects with Pulitzer Prize-winning author Charlie LeDuff: The Editor, a short film starring Richard Riehle based on LeDuff's career at The New York Times, and Bag Men, a feature screenplay written for Plan B Entertainment.

In 2009, Clark returned to China to shoot Goodbye Shanghai, a short film he also wrote about Western spies working as international bankers in Shanghai. The film garnished several national and international festival awards.

2010s

Caroline and Jackie
Clark's first feature film Caroline and Jackie premiered at the 2012 Tribeca Film Festival, and was met with positive reviews.

John Anderson of Variety said, "Displaying nerves of steel and a generous heart, helmer Adam Christian Clark takes a lot of chances with Caroline and Jackie, a tale of troubled sisters that keeps the viewer off balance throughout before delivering a payoff that serves as both catharsis and absolution. While it does make demands of its audience, the cumulative emotional impact is startling".

Steve Dollar of The Wall Street Journal called it "a delicious dinner party meltdown, visually polished and emotionally raw". He praised Moreau and Tulloch for "playing their yin/yang roles with gleaming intensity".

Miranda Siegel of New York Magazine named it a must-see film, praising its "top-notch performances" and its "unique combination of naturalistic acting and stylized technique".

The film was theatrically released by Phase 4 Films in 2013.

Newly Single
Clark's second feature film Newly Single, premiered in the main competition of the 2017 edition of PÖFF, and marks Clark's first time acting in a feature film.

The New York Times described the film as a dark comedy “probing the sexual and professional misadventures of a struggling filmmaker.”

The film was released in 2018 by Gravitas Ventures, and currently holds an 88% "Fresh" rating from the review aggregator website Rotten Tomatoes.

2020s

Diary of a Spy
Clark's third feature film Diary of a Spy was released by XYZ Films in mid 2022. Diary of a Spy marks Clark's first foray into a genre space and was generally not as well received critically as his prior works of drama.

Q.V. Hough of Vague Visages wrote, “‘Diary of a Spy’ mostly keeps viewers in the dark; it’s unclear what makes the main characters tick. Anna and Camden are Dostoevskian figures in spirit, from a different tale, who seem lost in time.”

Though, Clark's somber style garnished some praise. Shelagh Rowan-Legg wrote for Screen Anarchy, "Diary of a Spy takes us into this dark, dangerous world via an often neglected side door, probing this story with observations on human vulnerability and the price of exploiting it."

Influences and style

Influences
While an undergraduate film student at USC, Clark became close friends with his professor, Academy Award-nominated cinematographer William A. Fraker, A.S.C., B.S.C.  Clark accredits Fraker as an influence for hard lighting and formalistic production design.

Clark has attributed strong influence to the American New Wave film movement, and directors John Cassavetes, and Robert Altman.

Themes and style
Clark's films are very character driven, and often explore themes centered around family, isolation, and unrequited love.

When asked to describe his style in a 2012 interview with IndieWire, Clark stated, Stylistically my number one goal at all stages of production is for the narrative to always maintain the highest level of reality possible. My hope would be that the camera, the lighting, the sound, the performances, and my own ego will go as unnoticed as possible, and that you may feel, if just for a moment, that you are watching your own family interact. That view may come as a surprise, as the films' characters are highly vapid and their worlds’ greatly stylized. My answer would be that in being truly honest, we have to admit that we are all vapid, and our own little world is forever increasing in style and conformity.

Filmography

Feature films
Caroline and Jackie (2013)
Newly Single (2018)
Diary of a Spy (2022)

Short films
The Editor: a man i despise. (2008)
Goodbye Shanghai (2010)

References

External links

Living people
American film directors
American male screenwriters
USC School of Cinematic Arts alumni
1980 births